Paracosoryx is an extinct genus of antilocaprid that lived in North America during the Miocene.

Taxonomy
It was originally described as a subgenus of Cosoryx, but was elevated to full genus status. It has been suggest that Paracosoryx is paraphyletic, with some species more related to members of other genera than each other.

Description
The burr of Paracoryx is located relatively high on the shaft compared to other members  of Merycodontinae. The horn shaft is relatively long, with small, curved tines.

References

Prehistoric even-toed ungulate genera
Prehistoric pronghorns
Miocene even-toed ungulates
Miocene mammals of North America